Sokolinaya Gora District  ("Falcon Hill") is an administrative district (raion) of Eastern Administrative Okrug, and one of the 125 raions of Moscow, Russia. Population: 84,100 (2017 est.).

See also
Administrative divisions of Moscow

References

Notes

Sources

Districts of Moscow
Eastern Administrative Okrug